The Gallienus usurpers were the usurpers who claimed imperial power during the reign of Gallienus (253–268, the first part of which he shared with his father Valerian). The existence of usurpers during the Crisis of the Third Century was very common, and the high number of usurpers fought by Gallienus is due to his long rule; fifteen years was a long reign by the standards of the 3rd century Roman Empire.

Uprisings after the defeat of Valerian 
After Valerian's defeat and capture by the Persians in 260, his son Gallienus became the only emperor. However, many uprisings happened, both in the East, with the formation of the Palmyrene Empire, and in the West, with the birth of the Gallic Empire. With the uncertainty of the period, the legions wanted to restore Roman power in the wake of Valerian's defeat, against the pressure of the barbarian people in the west and the Persians in the East.

Usurpers in the West 
 260: Ingenuus – Chosen by the population and the army of the province of Pannonia.  Killed for Gallienus by Manius Acilius Aureolus in 260 during the battle at Mursa.
 260: Regalianus – After his victory over the Sarmatians in 260, he was killed by a coalition of his own people and of the Roxolani.
 260–269: Postumus – Ruled over a Gallic Empire until his murder in 269.
 268: Manius Acilius Aureolus – Initially a Gallienus supporter, Aureolus turned against Gallienus while fighting against Postumus and his Gallic Empire.  In 268, having surrendered to Emperor Claudius Gothicus after the death of Gallienus, Aureolus was murdered by the Praetorian Guard before Claudius could decide what to do with him.

Usurpers in the East 

 260–261: Macrianus Major, Macrianus Minor, Quietus, and Balista, in the East. After Valerian's defeat, Gallienus was the only remaining emperor, but he was in the West. The Eastern army, needing a leader, offered the rule to Macrianus Major, a noble and wealthy man, but he refused because of his age and health. With the help of Balista, the Valerian prefect who had defeated the Persians after the emperor's death, and with Valerian wealth he held from his office of procurator arcae et praepositus annonae in expeditione Persica, Macrianus Major made his two sons Macrianus Minor and Quietus emperors. While Quietus and Balista stayed in the East and in Egypt to secure their rule, Macrianus Major and Minor moved to Thrace, to counter Gallienus, ruler of Italy and Illyricum. However, Gallienus' general Aureolus defeated and killed in battle both the Macriani, while Quietus was killed by Odaenathus of Palmyra.
 261: Piso and Valens Thessalonicus, in Achaea. The only source for these two usurpers is the Historia Augusta. Valens was the governor of Achaea, and remained loyal to Gallienus. In his march west, Macrianus sent Lucius Calpurnius Piso Frugi to counter Valens. Valens' troops proclaimed their commander emperor, and Piso's troops did the same with their commander. Piso was then killed by Valens, who was later killed by his own troops. The account of Achaea events made by Historia Augusta is very obscure and contains some forgeries, such as a senatus consultum granting Piso a statue.
 261: Mussius Aemilianus, in Aegyptus Province. Mussius supported the Macriani rebellion, controlling Egypt. When the Macriani were defeated, he probably proclaimed himself emperor, but was defeated and killed by Aurelius Theodotus, a general sent by Gallienus.
 262: Memor was in Northern Africa. He projected a rebellion against Gallienus, but was killed by Theodotus.

Fictitious usurpers
The author(s) of the Historia Augusta, which modern scholars consider a forgery, listed several other Gallienus usurpers in the book on the Thirty Tyrants, among which:
 Trebellianus – rebelled in Isauria, gained control of Asia Minor, but was defeated by Camsisoleus, general of Gallienus, who was Egyptian and brother of Theodotus.
 Celsus – fictitious usurper of Africa. Allegedly proclaimed emperor by Vibius Passienus, proconsul of the province, and Fabius Pomponianus, general of the Libyan frontier. He ruled for seven days.
 Saturninus – not to be confused with Julius Saturninus, usurper under Probus, appears in the Historia Augusta as optimus ducum Gallieni temporis. According to this source, he was proclaimed emperor by his troops, but later killed by them for his severity. He is an apocryphal usurper, probably built on the model of Julius Saturninus.

See also
 Thirty Tyrants (Roman)

External links 
 Roman Emperors DIR account, with references